Surve( सुर्वे) is a Maratha warrior clan from India. A family belonging to the Surve clan held the jagir of Shringarpur. According to their lore, their ancestor was Shyam Singh (also known as Ajit Singh), a Rajput from Udaipur. In 14th century, he came to Deogiri, where he served the Yadava dynasty. Later, he changed his alliance to the Bahmani Sultanate, and was given the Shringarpur jagir. He was also given the title "Shurvir", which later got corrupted to "Surve".

People with surname Surve include:
 Iqbal Survé, Indian South African businessman
 Manya Surve, Mumbai mobster
 Narayan Gangaram Surve, Marathi-language poet
 Prakash Surve, Shiv Sena politician
 Shivani Surve, television actress in Hindi and Marathi TV serials

References 

Maratha clans